VBD may refer to:

 Violent by Design, an album by Jedi Mind Tricks
 Violent By Design (professional wrestling), a professional wrestling stable in Impact Wrestling
 Voltage at Break-down